Yekaterina Aydova (born 30 July 1991) is a Kazakhstani speed skater, born in Karaganda. She competed at the 2011, 2012 and 2013 World Sprint Championships in Salt Lake City, the 2014 World Sprint Championships in Nagano, and at the 2014 Winter Olympics in Sochi.

In January 2022, Aydova was named as one of Kazakhstan's flagbearer during the opening ceremony of the 2022 Winter Olympics.

References 

1991 births
Kazakhstani female speed skaters
Speed skaters at the 2010 Winter Olympics
Speed skaters at the 2014 Winter Olympics
Speed skaters at the 2018 Winter Olympics
Speed skaters at the 2022 Winter Olympics
Olympic speed skaters of Kazakhstan
Speed skaters at the 2011 Asian Winter Games
Speed skaters at the 2017 Asian Winter Games
Universiade medalists in speed skating
Living people
Sportspeople from Karaganda
Universiade bronze medalists for Kazakhstan
Competitors at the 2017 Winter Universiade